The 2007 Air Canada Cup was the fifth edition of the women's ice hockey tournament. It was held from January 3-7, 2007 in Ravensburg, Germany. The Canadian U22 national team won the tournament by defeating Germany in the final.

Tournament

First round

Group A

Group B

Final round

5th place game

Semifinals

3rd place game

Final

External links
Tournament on hockeyarchives.info

2007–08
2007–08 in women's ice hockey
2007–08 in Swiss ice hockey
2007–08 in German ice hockey
2007–08 in Canadian women's ice hockey
2007–08 in Finnish ice hockey
2007–08 in Russian ice hockey
2007